Park Gyeong-ho or Park Kyung-ho may refer to:
 Park Kyung-ho (judoka)
 Park Kyung-ho (footballer)